Nicholas John Fitzgerald (born 13 February 1992), is an Australian professional soccer player who plays for Sydney Olympic

Playing career

Club career
Fitzgerald grew up on Sydney's Hills Shire and played with several local clubs before playing for Blacktown City Demons in their youth teams. He was signed by the Central Coast Mariners in the A-League for their youth team, and was promoted into the senior team for their round 27 clash against Wellington Phoenix at Westpac Stadium. Central Coast would lose the game 3–0, with Fitzgerald coming on as a second-half substitute.

In July 2010, he went on loan to Queensland State League club Bundaberg Spirit to gain match time and experience. On 1 August 2011 Fitzgerald signed a two-year deal with A-League side Brisbane Roar FC after a four-week trial period.

On 14 January 2013, Fitzgerald rejoined Central Coast after a mutual decision between Brisbane and the player to return to his original club.

On 9 January 2016, Fitzgerald was released by the Mariners.

On 17 January 2016, it was announced that Fitzgerald had moved to Melbourne City for the remainder of the 2015-16 A-League season. Fitzgerald scored his first goal against Adelaide United to end the reds 14 game unbeaten run. The following week Fitzgerald scored the third goal in City's 3–1 over Brisbane Roar to send City to the top of the ladder.

On 3 May 2018, Fitzgerald was released by Melbourne City and signed with Western Sydney Wanderers.

On 24 June 2019, Fitzgerald joined Newcastle Jets on a two year deal.

On 21 October 2020, Fitzgerald joined Indian Super League club Jamshedpur FC on a one year deal.

In February 2022, Fitzgerald returned to Australia, signing with Perth Glory for the remainder of the 2021–22 A-League Men season.

International career
On 7 March 2012 Fitzgerald was selected to represent the Australia Olympic football team in an Asian Olympic Qualifier match against Iraq.

Honours

Club
Brisbane Roar
A-League Championship: 2011–12

Central Coast Mariners
A-League Championship: 2012–13

Melbourne City
FFA Cup: 2016

References

External links
 

1992 births
Living people
Australia under-20 international soccer players
Association football midfielders
Soccer players from Sydney
Central Coast Mariners FC players
Brisbane Roar FC players
Melbourne City FC players
Blacktown City FC players
Western Sydney Wanderers FC players
Newcastle Jets FC players
Jamshedpur FC players
Perth Glory FC players
A-League Men players
Australian soccer players
Indian Super League players
Expatriate footballers in India
Australian expatriate sportspeople in India
People educated at Oakhill College